Halkyn (Flintshire Welsh: Lygian ) is a village and community in Flintshire, north-east Wales and situated between Pentre Halkyn, Northop and Rhosesmor. At the 2001 Census the population of the community was 2,876, increasing slightly to 2,879 at the 2011 Census. Pentre Halkyn is in the community.

History 
Halkyn is one of the ancient parishes of Flintshire, originally comprising the townships of Hendrefigillt, Lygan y Llan and Lygan y Wern. The area was notable during the Roman occupation for the mining of lead. The village was recorded in the Domesday Book of 1086 as Alchene, when it was then part of Cheshire, in England.

Halkyn had many public houses in the early 19th century. These public houses included the Crown Inn, (now known as Crown Cottages) which was situated on the left-hand side as you go towards Rhes-y-cae from the Old Halkyn Post Office. The Royal Oak (now a private house known as the Old Royal Oak), directly opposite the Blue Bell down a lane going towards Pen-y-parc Farm. Also the Raven (now known as Raven Cottage) in the Catch; and the Blue Bell Inn, which is still operating. There were also a few shops: a butcher, a post office (originally run from Holly House then from over the road; now closed), the Crown Inn (a shop until 1892, when it was licensed as a beerhouse) and the former Scranton Stores, which occupied Scranton House, now a private house called Swn-y-mynydd.

Governance
An electoral ward in the same name exists. The population of this ward at the 2011 Census was 1,785. The Halkyn ward includes the villages of Halkyn, Rhes-y-cae and Rhosesmor and elects one county councillor to Flintshire County Council.

Amenities 
The village has a football club Halkyn United F.C., a cricket club, a post office (run as part of the Blue Bell Inn), a parish church, a library, and two public houses, the Britannia and the award-winning Blue Bell Inn.

Notable people
 Dan Jones, translator of the Book of Mormon into Welsh.

References

External links
Halkyn Community Website
Geograph.co.uk, photos of Halkyn and surrounding area

Communities in Flintshire
Villages in Flintshire
Wards of Flintshire